The Crusader state of the Kingdom of Jerusalem, created in 1099, was divided into a number of smaller seigneuries.  According to the 13th-century jurist John of Ibelin, the four highest crown vassals (referred to as barons) in the kingdom proper were the count of Jaffa and Ascalon, the prince of Galilee, the lord of Sidon, and the lord of Oultrejordain.

There were also a number of independent seigneuries, and some land held under direct royal control, such as Jerusalem itself, Acre and Tyre.

Northern states 
Aside from the Kingdom of Jerusalem, there were also three other major Crusader states in the Near East:
County of Edessa
County of Tripoli
Principality of Antioch

These states nominally bore some dependency on the kingdom of Jerusalem. The king of Jerusalem was bound to reconcile them in case of disputes, or between a vassal prince and the Latin patriarch of Antioch, and could claim the regency in case of a vacancy or minority in their successions.

Edessa was perhaps the most closely tied to the kingdom, despite its distance. Its first two counts became kings of Jerusalem, and the county was bestowed as a royal gift on Joscelin I of Edessa.

The County of Tripoli, the nearest of them, is sometimes considered to have been a vassal lordship under the king's suzerainty, although it preserved an extraordinary degree of sovereignty.

Antioch was almost independent, for it was founded already before the kingship and its first holder was a rival of kings, the original leader of the crusade. Later in its history, it would at times recognize Byzantine or Armenian suzerainty, or none at all.

These states dated their documents by the reigns of their own rulers, carried out their own foreign policy, and sent military aid to the kingdom of their own will, rather than through feudal obligation; therefore, they are generally recognized as sovereign and are treated more fully under their own articles.

County of Jaffa and Ascalon 

Jaffa, on the Mediterranean coast, was fortified after the First Crusade, and was a separate county until the revolt of Hugh II of Le Puiset in 1134. Afterwards, it was usually held directly by the royal family or one of their relatives. After 1153, it became the double County of Jaffa and Ascalon, when the Fatimid fortress of Ascalon was conquered. It passed in and out of direct royal control, and became titular after the loss of the counties to the Muslims in the 13th-century . A number of seigneuries were vassals to the count of Jaffa, including the Lordship of Ramla, Lordship of Ibelin and Lordship of Mirabel.

Counts of Jaffa 

Jaffa was taken by the Crusaders in June 1099 during the siege of Jerusalem and became part of the kingdom shortly thereafter.  The counts of Jaffa were:

Royal domain, 1100–1110
Hugh I of Jaffa, first cousin of king Baldwin II of Jerusalem, 1110–1118
 Albert of Namur, stepfather and regent to Hugh II, 1118–1122
Hugh II of Jaffa, son of Hugh I, 1122–1134
Melisende of Jerusalem, 1134–1151, with her husband Fulk (1131–1143) and her son Baldwin III (1143–1151)
Amalric I of Jerusalem, son of Melisende and Fulk, 1151–1153 (when he reached the age of maturity).

Jaffa merged with newly-conquered Ascalon in 1153, becoming the County of Jaffa and Ascalon.

Counts of Jaffa and Ascalon 

After the siege of Ascalon in 1153, the frontier fortress of Ascalon joined Jaffa in a combined county.  The counts of Jaffa and Ascalon were:

Amalric I of Jerusalem, 1153–1174 (as king from 1163)
Baldwin IV of Jerusalem, 1174–1176
Sibylla of Jerusalem, 1176–1187, with her husbands William of Montferrat (1176–1177) and Guy of Lusignan (1180–1187)
Jaffa and Ascalon occupied by Ayyubids, 1187–1191
 Geoffrey of Lusignan (1191–1193), brother of Guy of Lusignan
Amalric II of Jerusalem, brother of Guy of Lusignan, 1193–1197
 Amalric II of Jerusalem, as king, with his wife Isabella I, 1197–1205
Maria of Montferrat, 1205–1212, with her husband John of Brienne (1210–1212)
Isabella II of Jerusalem, under regency of her father John of Brienne, 1212–1221
Walter IV of Brienne (1221–1244), nephew of John of Brienne and husband of Amalric II's granddaughter, 1221–1244
John of Ibelin, son of Philip of Ibelin, Isabella I's half-brother, 1244–1266
Ascalon occupied by Ayyubids, 1247
 James of Ibelin, son of John, 1266–1268
Jaffa occupied by Mamluks, 1268.

Lordship of Ramla 

Originally held by the bishop of Ramla-Lydda, in 1126 Ramla became part of Jaffa, and a separate lordship was created after Hugh II's revolt in 1134. The castle of Ibelin happened to be located quite near Ramla. It was later a part of the Lordship of Ibelin, inherited from Helvis of Ramla, daughter of Baldwin I of Ramla and wife of Barisan of Ibelin.  The Lords of Ramla were:

Baldwin I of Ramla, 1134–1138
Barisan of Ibelin, 1138–1150
Manasses of Hierges, 1150–1152)
Hugh of Ibelin, son of Barisan of Ibelin, 1152–1169
Baldwin of Ibelin, brother of Hugh of Ibelin, 1169–1186
 Thomas of Ibelin, son of Baldwin of Ibelin, 1186–1187
Ramla occupied by Ayyubids, 1187–1191
Balian of Ibelin, brother of Baldwin of Ibelin, 1191–1193
John of Ibelin, son of Balian, 1193–1247
Lordship held by Counts of Jaffa and Ascalon after 1247.

Lordship of Ibelin 

The Lordship of Ibelin was also created out of Jaffa (in the 1140s, or perhaps as early as 1134 after Hugh II's revolt). The lordship was given as a reward to Barisan of Ibelin, whose wife Helvis of Ramla already owned lands in the vicinity. The castle of Ramla, the family's other inheritance, was nearby, and together these territories formed a wealthy entity.  Balian of Ibelin married Maria Comnena, widow of Amalric I of Jerusalem, and the Ibelins became the most powerful noble family of the kingdom, later ruling also over Beirut (see Lordship of Beirut, below).  The lords of Ibelin were:

Barisan of Ibelin, c. 1134–1150
Hugh of Ibelin, son of Barisan of Ibelin, 1150–1170
Balian of Ibelin, son of Barisan of Ibelin, 1170–1193
John of Ibelin, son of Balian, 1193–1236
Lordship held by Counts of Jaffa and Ascalon after 1236.

Lordship of Mirabel 
Mirabel was separated from Jaffa after the revolt in 1134, and given to Baldwin of Ibelin in 1166, although it was separate from Ibelin.  He was succeeded by his son Thomas of Ibelin, ruling from 1186–1188.

Principality of Galilee 

The Principality of Galilee was established by Tancred in 1099 and was centered around Tiberias in Galilee proper, and was sometimes called the Principality of Tiberias or the Tiberiad.  The principality became the fief of the families of Saint Omer, Montfaucon (Falcomberques), and then Bures.  The principality was destroyed by Saladin in 1187, although the title was used by relatives and younger sons of the kings of Cyprus (the titular kings of Jerusalem) afterwards.  The principality had its own vassals, the Lordships of Beirut, Nazareth and Haifa, which often had their own sub-vassals.

Princes of Galilee 
The princes of Galilee were:

 Tancred, 1099–1101
 Hugh of Fauquembergues, 1101–1106
 Gervaise de Bazoches, 1106–1108
 Tancred, second reign, 1109–1112
 Joscelin I of Edessa (as Lord of Courtenay), 1112–1119
 William I of Bures, 1120–1141
 Elinand, 1142–1148
 William II of Bures, brother of Elinand, 1148–1158
 Eschiva of Bures, 1159–1187, with Gautier of Saint Omer (1159–1171) and Raymond III of Tripoli (1174–1187)
 Galilee occupied by Ayyubids, 1187–1240
 Eschiva of Saint Omer, granddaughter of William II, 1240–1247, with Odo of Montbéliard (1240–1247)
 Galilee taken by Ayyubids, 1247.

The sons of William I I of Bures were titular princes of Galilee after the death of Eschiva of Bures in 1187:  Hugh II of Saint Omer from 1187–1204 and Raoul of Saint Omer from 1204–1219.  Eschiva of Saint Omer was daughter of Raoul of Saint Omer, and she was titular Princess of Galilee from 1219–1240 and 1247 until after 1265.  He husband was titular Prince of Galilee from 1219–1240.

Lordship of Beirut 
Beirut was captured in 1110 and given to Fulk of Guînes. It was one of the longest-lived seigneuries, surviving until the final collapse of the kingdom in 1291, although only as a tiny strip on the Mediterranean coast surrounding Beirut. It was important for trade with Europe, and had its own vassals within the Principality of Galilee.  The lords of Beirut were :

Fulk of Guînes, 1110–1117
Royal domain 1117–1125
Walter I Brisebarre, 1125–1138
Guy I Brisebarre, 1138–1149
Walter II Brisebarre, 1149–1156
Guy II Brisebarre, 1156–1164
Walter III Brisebarre, 1164–1166
Royal domain 1166–?
Beirut occupied by Ayyubids, 1187–1198
John I of Ibelin, 1204–1236
Balian of Ibelin, 1236–1247
John II of Ibelin, 1247–1264
Isabella of Ibelin, 1264–1282, with her husbands and regent:
Hugh II of Cyprus, 1265–1267
Haymo Létrange, 1272–1273
Alice de la Roche, as regent to her daughter Isabella, 1274–1277
Nicholas Aleman, 1277
William Barlais, 1278–1282
Eschive d'Ibelin, 1282–1291, with her husbands:
Humphrey of Montfort, 1282–1284
Guy of Cyprus, 1291

Beirut taken by Mamluks, 1291.

The sub-vassals of Beirut were the Lordship of Banias and the Lordship of Toron.

Lordship of Banias 
Banias (Caesarea Philippi) was under the control of the Assassins from 1126–1129, when it was given to the Franks following the purge of the sect in Damascus by Taj al-Muluk Buri.  The area was in dispute from 1132–1140 when Banias was merged with Toron under Humphrey II of Toron.  It fell to Nur ad-Din in 1164, and when recovered it became part of the Lordship of Joscelin III of Edessa (see below).

Lordship of Toron 

The castle of Toron was built by Hugh of Fauquembergues to help capture Tyre, and was given to Humphrey I of Toron in 1107. The lords of Toron tended to be very influential in the kingdom.  Humphrey II was constable of Jerusalem.  This grandson Humphrey IV was married to Isabella, Amalric I's daughter.  Toron was later merged with the royal domain of Tyre.  Toron had two vassals of its own, the Lordship of Castel Neuf, which fell to Nur ad-Din in 1167, and the Lordship of Toron-Ahmud, which was sold to the Teutonic Knights in 1261.  The lords of Toron were:

 Humphrey I of Toron, before 1109–after 1136
 Humphrey II of Toron, son of Humphrey I, before 1137–1179
 Humphrey IV of Toron, grandson of Humphrey II, 1179–1183
 Royal domain, 1183–1187
 Toron occupied by Ayyubids, 1187–1229
 Alice of Armenia, granddaughter of Humphrey II, 1229–after 1236
 Maria of Antioch-Armenia, granddaughter of Alice, after 1236–1239
 Toron occupied by Ayyubids, 1239–1241
 Toron merged with Lordship of Tyre, 1241.

Lordship of Nazareth 
Nazareth was the original site of the Latin patriarch, established by Tancred. It was created as a seigneury in Galilee in 1115.  The archbishop of Nazareth also ruled over Haifa.

Lordship of Haifa 
Haifa was partly an ecclesiastical domain ruled by the archbishop of Nazareth, and partly created from other lands in the Principality of Galilee.  The lords of Haifa were:

Geldemar Carpenel, 1100–1101
Tancred, 1101–1103
 Rorgius, 1103–1107
 Pagan, 1107–1112
Royal domain, 1112–1187
Haifa occupied by Ayyubids, 1187–1191
 Vivian, c. 1140s
 Pagan, 1190–?
 Rorgius II, ?–1244?
 Garsias Alvarez, c. 1250
 Gilles d'Estrain, c. 1260
Haifa taken by Mamluks, 1265.

Lordship of Sidon 

The cities of Sidon (Saete/Sagette) and Caesarea Maritima (Caesarea) were captured by the Crusaders between 1101 and 1110.  A noblemen Eustace I Grenier, a trussed advisor of Baldwin I of Jerusalem, was granted the lordship of both cities.  He founded a dynasty that ruled until the 1260s when they were lost to the conquering Mongols and Mamluks.

Lords of Sidon 

Sidon became part of the Kingdom of Jerusalem following the siege of Sidon in 1110.  The lords of Sidon were:

 Eustace I Grenier, 1110–1123
 Gerard Grenier, son of Eustace I, 1123–1171
 Renaud Grenier, son of Gerard, 1171–1187
 Occupied by Ayyubids, 1187–1197
 Renaud Grenier, lordship restored, 1197–1202
 Balian I Grenier, son of Renaud, 1202–1239
 Julian Grenier, son of Balian I, 1239–1260
 Sidon destroyed by Ayyubids in 1249 and Mongols in 1260
 Sidon sold to the Knights Templar, 1260.

Lordship of Caesarea 
Caesarea was captured in 1101 and given to the archbishop of Caesarea. The lords of Caearea were :

Eustace I Grenier, 1110–1123
Walter I Grenier, son of Eustace I, 1123–1154
Hugh Grenier, son of Walter I, 1154–1169
Guy Grenier, son of Hugh, fl. 1170s
Walter II Grenier, brother of Guy, c. 1180s–1189/1191
Caesarea occupied by Ayyubids, 1187–1191
Juliana Grenier, sister of Walter II, 1189/1193–1213/1216, with husbands:
Guy Brisebarre (possible lord), after 1183
Aymar de Lairon, 1189/1193–1213/1216
Walter III, son of Juliana and Guy Brisebarre, 1213/1216–1229
John, son of Walter III, 1229–1238/1241
Margaret, daughter of John, 1238/1241–1255/1265 with her husband:
John Aleman, 1238/1243–1264/1265
Nicholas Aleman, son of John Aleman (possible lord or titular lord), d. 1277
Caesarea taken by Mamluks, 1265 
John of Nevilles, 1384–?
John Gorap?

Lordship of the Schuf 
The Schuf was created out of the Lordship of Sidon as a sub-vassal around 1170. It was centred on the Cave of Tyron. Julian of Sidon sold it to the Teutonic Knights in 1256.

Lordship of Oultrejordain

The Lordship of Oultrejordain, consisting of land with an undefined boundary to the east of the Jordan River, was one of the largest and most important seigneuries. It was an important source of revenue, from the Muslim caravan routes that existed there. The last lord, Raynald of Châtillon, received Oultrejordain by marrying its heiress, Stephanie of Milly. Raynald considered himself prince of Oultrejordain, not subject to the king, and was especially hostile to the Muslims. He was largely responsible for Saladin's invasion of the kingdom in 1187. Saladin conquered much of the area in 1187 and personally executed Raynald at the Battle of Hattin.  The lords of Oultrejordain were:

 Roman of Le Puy, possibly 1118–1126
 Pagan the Butler, 1126–1147
 Maurice of Montreal, nephew of Pagan, 1147–1161
 Philip of Milly, with his wife Isabella, daughter of Maurice, 1161–1168
 Stephanie de Milly, daughter and heiress, whose husbands exercised the powers of the lordship:
 Humphrey III of Toron, 1168–1173
 Miles of Plancy, 1173–1174
 Raynald of Châtillon, 1176–1187

 Oultrejordain lost to Saladin, 1187.

Other seigneuries 
(Titular lords/princes are italicized)

Lordship of Adelon 
The Lordship of Adelon seems to have been created after the center of the kingdom was moved to Acre, and held some influence under Frederick II, Holy Roman Emperor.

Adam
Agnes, c. 1200
Thierry de Termonde (died 1206)
Daniel of Terremonde (died after 1225)
Daniel II of Terremonde
Peter, c. 1250
Jordan

Lordship of Arsuf 
Arsuf, located north of Jaffa, (called Arsur by the Crusaders) was captured in 1101 but remained a royal domain until around 1163 when John of Arsuf became lord.  The lords of Arsuf were:

Royal domain, 1101–1163
John of Arsuf, 1163–1177
Arsuf occupied by Ayyubids, 1187–1191
Melisende of Arsuf, sister of John of Arsuf, 1177– at least 1218, with Thierry of Orguenes (c. 1190s)
John of Ibelin, husband of Melisende, before 1209–1236
John of Arsuf, son of Melisende of Arsuf and John of Ibelin, 1236–1258
Balian of Ibelin, 1258–1261
Arsuf sold to Knights Hospitaller, 1261
Arsuf taken by Mamluks, 1265
Balian of Ibelin, titular 1261–1277
John of Ibelin, son of Balian, 1277–1309
Balian of Ibelin, son of John, 1309–1333
Philip of Ibelin, son of Balian, 1333–1373.

Lordship of Bethlehem

Balian II of Ibelin (died before April 19, 1316), also titular Prince of Galilee.

Lordship of Bethsan 
Bethsan was occupied by Tancred in 1099; it was never part of Galilee, despite its location, but became a royal domain in 1101, probably until around 1120. It occasionally passed back under royal control until new lords were created.

Adam of Bethune
Adam II, son of Adam
John, – after 1129
Guermond, son of Adam II, – after 1174
Hugh of Gibelet
Walter
Adam III
Guermond II, c. 1210
Baldwin
Walter, c. 1310?
Thibaut

Lordship of Blanchegarde 
Blanchegarde (modern Tell es-Safi) was built by Fulk of Jerusalem in 1142, as part of the royal domain, and administered by the royal castellans.  It became a lordship in 1166, when it was given to Walter III Brisebarre, lord of Beirut.

Walter III Brisebarre, 1166–1187
Blanchegarde taken by Ayyubids, 1191, 1192
Gilles, c. 1210
Raoul, ?–1265
Amalric Barlais, 1265–?

Lordship of Botrun 
The Lordship of Botrun was a fief around the city Batrun from 1115:

Raymond of Agoult, before 1174
William Dorel, until 1174
Cecilia (Lucia), 1174–1181/1206; married Plivain
Isabella, 1206–1244; married Bohemond of Botron, son of Bohemond III
William, 1244–1262
John I, 1262–1277
Rudolf (Rostain), 1277–1289

Lordship of Caymont 
Caymont was created in 1192 after the Third Crusade for Balian of Ibelin, who had lost his other territories to Saladin. It eventually passed into the royal domain.

Lordship of Dera 
Little is known about Dera, except that it was created in 1118, during the reign of Baldwin II of Jerusalem.

Lordship of Hebron 
Hebron, known to the Crusaders as "Castellion Saint Abraham", was one of the earliest seigneuries created. Hebron had been under royal control at various times before 1149. It had its own sub-vassal, the Lordship of Beth Gibelin, created by Fulk in 1149. Soon afterwards Hebron became a royal domain and Beth Gibelin passed to the Knights Hospitaller.

Geldemar Carpenel, 1100
Gerard of Avesnes, 1100–1101
Royal domain, 1102–1104
Hugh of Rebecques, 1104
Royal domain, 1104–1108
Walter Mahomet, 1108–1118
Royal domain, 1118–1120
Baldwin of Saint Abraham, 1120–1136
Hugh II of Saint Abraham, 1136–1149
Royal domain, 1149–1161
Hebron merged with Lordship of Oultrejordain, 1161
Under Ayyubid control, 1187–1191
Royal domain, 1191
Hebron destroyed by Khwarazmians, 1244.

Lordship of Montgisard 
Montgisard (possibly Gezer) was built as a defense against Nur ad-Din, and was the site of the Battle of Montgisard in 1177.

William, c. 1155
John
Aimard, c. 1198
Reginald, c. 1200
William, c. 1230
Robert, c. 1240
Henry (?)
Balian, c. 1300
William
Baldwin
Robert
John
James, c. 1400.

Lordship of Nablus 
Nablus was first captured in 1099 by Tancred, and named "Naples" by the Crusaders. It later became a separate lordship out of part of Oultrejordain. It was lost during Saladin's conquest of the kingdom.

Royal domain, 1099–
Pagan the Butler, 1126–?
Guy of Milly, ?–1142 or between 1138–1144
Philip of Milly, son of Guy, 1142 or between 1138–1144–1161
Maria Comnena, received the lordship from her first husband Amalric I of Jerusalem
Balian of Ibelin, 1177, Maria's second husband
Stephanie of Ibelin, sister of Balian
Nablus taken by Ayyubids, 1187.

Nablus was technically part of the royal domain, and also had a royal viscount, who governed in place of the monarch :

Ulric, 1115–1152
Baldwin Bubalus, c. 1159–1162
Baldwin, son of Ulric, c. 1162–1176
Amalric, c. 1176–1187.

Lordship of Scandalion 
Scandelion, today's Iskandarouna in the Tyre District of the South Governorate of Lebanon, was built in 1116 as a royal domain. Denys Pringle quotes William of Tyre indicating the year 1117 for the date when Baldwin I has built the castle of Scandalion. It became a lordship by 1148 when Guy of Scandalion was created lord.

Guy of Scandalion, c. 1150
Peter
Raymond, c. 1200
William of Mandelee
Raymond
Philip, c. 1270
Humphrey, c. 1300
Eschiva, c. 1370.

Lordship of Tyre 

Conrad of Montferrat practically created this lordship during the Third Crusade by defending it, as it was the only remaining town of the kingdom. Tyre, always an important town, had been part of the royal domain, and after Conrad, it also belonged to the kings personally. After the kingdom moved to Acre, coronations took place in Tyre. Sometime after 1246, Tyre was conferred upon Philip of Montfort by Henry I of Cyprus (then regent of Jerusalem) for his support of the Ibelin (baronial) party against the Imperialists. The grant was confirmed c. 1269 by Hugh III of Cyprus, with a clause allowing Hugh to buy back the lordship. This was exercised in 1284, when the city was given to his sister Margaret, already the dowager lady of Tyre.  The lords of Tyre were:

 Royal domain, 1124–1129
 Fulk of Anjou, 1129–1131
 Royal domain, 1131–1187
 Conrad of Montferrat, 1190–1192
 Royal domain. 1192–1246
 Philip of Montfort, 1246–1269
 John of Montfort, son of Philip, 1269–1283
 Humphrey of Montfort, brother of John, 1283–1284
 Royal domain, 1284–1289
 Amalric of Lusignan, 1289–1291
 Tyre taken by Mamluks, 1291.

Lordship of Joscelin III of Edessa 
This lordship, often called the seigneurie de Joscelin, was an unusual creation given to Joscelin III, the nominal Count of Edessa, which had been lost long before. It was created around 1176 when Joscelin married Agnes of Milly, and was formed from royal land around Acre. Joscelin had only daughters, who married into the families of von Henneberg and Mandelee. The heirs sold in 1220 the seigneury to the Teutonic Knights, who used the place near Acre as their fortress in Outremer. The archives of the lordship are the only baronial archives of Outremer to survive.

Inheritance in the Kingdom of Jerusalem 
Lordships in the Kingdom of Jerusalem were usually hereditary, in principle, but in practice the circumstances were such that their holders did not form long uninterrupted lines of inheritance, which was contrary to the usual patterns of succession in Europe.

Firstly, in the early years of the kingdom, lords sought out their own territories, and lordships changed hands often. Secondly, the average lifespan of male lords in Palestine was rather low, due to the constant state of warfare and violence, which led to inheritances by females and/or extinction of whole families.

Succession from father to son happened more rarely than in more peaceful countries in Europe. Female succession opened up the option for the liege or the monarch to reward services, loyalty and capability, as well as achievements, by giving an heiress' hand in marriage and her inherited lordship to a "new man".

A typical succession pattern was a father followed by a daughter, sister, or niece, who was then married to a man worthy of some reward, who then himself succeeded to the territory. This made the succession unpredictable and caused the family holding a particular territory to change once or perhaps even more often in a generation.

Sometimes families became extinct, or escaped from Syria, and either a distant relative came to claim their land, or more usually, their liege gave the lordship to another family. Sometimes a lord was condemned for treason, rebellion or some other reason, and he and possibly his descendants were disinherited from the lordship.

Occasionally, vacant lordships were put into the royal domain, but more often, another person received the lordship. A less careful observer may think that they were not hereditary, but almost always their succession took place according to feudal rights of inheritance, utilizing the relatively high number of heiresses.

Many of these seigneuries ceased to exist after the loss of Jerusalem in 1187, and the rest of them after the fall of Acre in 1291, yet they often had Cypriot or European claimants for decades or centuries afterwards; these claimants, of course, held no actual territory in Syria after the mainland kingdom was lost.

See also 
 Crusader states
 Kingdom of Jerusalem
 Kings of Jerusalem
 Kings of Jerusalem family tree
 Officers of the Kingdom of Jerusalem
 Haute Cour of Jerusalem
 Assizes of Jerusalem

Notes

Further reading
 
 

Feudalism in the Kingdom of Jerusalem
Medieval titles
Lordships of the Crusader states